This is a list of the main career statistics of English professional darts player, Phil Taylor, whose professional career lasted from 1987 to 2018. Taylor won 214 professional titles and was runner-up in 48 finals. He won a record 85 major titles and a record 16 World Championships. In team events, he won 10 titles including being a four-time winner of the PDC World Cup of Darts and has had 2 runners-up finishes in team events. In 1999 and 2004 he defeated the reigning BDO champion in a special challenge match.

Career finals

BDO major finals: 7 (4 titles, 3 runners-up)

PDC major finals: 92 (79 titles, 13 runners-up)

Independent  major finals: 2 (2 titles)

PDC world series finals: 10 (8 titles, 2 runners-up)

PDC team finals: 8 (6 titles, 2 runners-up)

Other WDF/BDO finals

WDF major finals: 2 (2 titles)

WDF team finals: 4 (4 titles)

Champion vs Champion: 2 (2 titles) 

* The match was best of 13 sets, but Fordham retired after the seventh set due to ill-health

Seniors major finals: 2 (2 runners-up)

Performance timelines

(W) Won; (F) finalist; (SF) semifinalist; (QF) quarterfinalist; (#R) rounds 6, 5, 4, 3, 2, 1; (RR) round-robin stage; (Prel.) Preliminary round; (DNQ) Did not qualify; (DNP) Did not participate; (NH) Not held

Majors

World Series of Darts

Head-to-head record
Only players who have featured in a major PDC or BDO final are listed.

Players who have been world champions are in boldface.
Won–Lost–Draw, in that order.

 Raymond van Barneveld 61–18–4 (73.49%)
 Adrian Lewis 55–17–2 (74.32%)
 James Wade 51–14–6 (71.83%)
 Simon Whitlock 41–7 (85.42%)
 Ronnie Baxter 41–5 (89.13%)
 Gary Anderson 40–17–3 (66.67%)
 Terry Jenkins 39–4–3 (84.78%)
 Andy Hamilton 38–5 (88.37%)
 Dennis Priestley 37–6–1 (84.09%)
 Colin Lloyd 35–4–1 (87.50%)
 Michael van Gerwen 34–26–2 (54.84%)
 Wes Newton 32–2 (94.12%)
 Kevin Painter 32–1 (96.97%)
 Mervyn King 31–8–2 (75.61%)
 John Part 31–6 (83.78%)
 Wayne Mardle 29–3 (90.63%)
 Mark Walsh 26–5 (83.87%)
 Steve Beaton 26–2 (92.86%)
 Roland Scholten 25–0–2 (92.59%)
 Paul Nicholson 24–2 (92.31%)
 Dave Chisnall 23–9 (71.88%)
 Vincent van der Voort 23–4 (85.19%)
 Peter Wright 22–11–3 (62.86%)
 Robert Thornton 22–6 (78.57%)
 Peter Manley 22–3 (88%)
 Mark Webster 20–2 (90.91%)
 Alan Warriner-Little 19–3 (86.36%)
 Colin Osborne 19–2 (90.48%)
 Bob Anderson 18–3 (85.71%)
 Brendan Dolan 18–1 (94.74%)
 Jelle Klaasen 14–3 (82.35%)
 Wayne Jones 15–1 (93.75%)
 Mark Dudbridge 14–1–1 (87.50%)
 John Lowe 12–1 (92.31%)
 Kim Huybrechts 11–1–1 (84.62%)
 Shayne Burgess 11–0 (100%)
 Richie Burnett 10–1 (90.91%)
 Co Stompé 10–1 (90.91%)
 Stephen Bunting 9–1–1 (81.82%)
 Rod Harrington 9–7 (60%)
 Andy Fordham 7–0 (100%)
 Gary Mawson 6–1 (85.71%)
 Darren Webster 6–2 (75%)
 Dave Askew 5–1 (83.33%)
 Darryl Fitton 5–1 (83.33%)
 Mensur Suljović 5–1 (83.33%)
 Barrie Bates 4–1 (80%)
 Peter Evison 4–4 (50%)
 Dave Whitcombe 4–1 (80%)
 Robbie Green 4–0 (100%)
 Keith Deller 4–0 (100%)
 Colin Monk 4–0 (100%)
 Martin Phillips 4–0 (100%)
 Martin Adams 3–1 (75%)
 Mike Gregory 3–1 (75%)
 Stuart Kellett 3–1 (75%)
 Jocky Wilson 3–1 (75%)
 Eric Bristow 3–0 (100%)
 Cliff Lazarenko 3–0 (100%)
 Christian Kist 3–0 (100%)
 Alan Norris 3–0 (100%)
 Kirk Shepherd 3–0 (100%)
 Dean Winstanley 2–0 (100%)
 Ted Hankey 1–1 (50%)
 Scott Waites 1–1 (50%)
 Rob Cross 0–1 (0%)

High averages

Taylor had recorded the majority of the highest ever televised averages, but Michael van Gerwen is slowly taking these records. Taylor's highest ever average was achieved in round four of the 2010 UK Open, in which he averaged 118.66 in a 9–0 win over Kevin Painter. This stood until 2016 when Van Gerwen set a new world record of 123.40. Taylor had the World Championship record of 111.21 which he set in the 2002 event, but Van Gerwen raised it to 114.05 in 2017. Taylor holds the record for the highest average in a PDC World Championship final of 110.94 which he set whilst beating Raymond van Barneveld in 2009. In March 2015, Taylor recorded the highest ever losing average, as Van Barneveld beat him 7–4 in the Premier League with Taylor averaging 115.80. Taylor holds the highest tournament average with 111.54 set at the 2009 European Championship. Taylor's lifetime average from 774 matches in which it was recorded is 101.28, the highest of any player.

Nine-dart finishes

Taylor has supplemented his accomplishments in televised tournaments by frequently achieving the perfect leg of darts- a nine-dart finish. The first time he achieved this was at the Winter Gardens in Blackpool, against Chris Mason in the televised World Matchplay Championship in 2002. He has achieved the feat 11 times on television (and 22 times overall), including four times in the UK Open at the Reebok Stadium, Bolton (2004, 2005, 2007, and 2008).

On 24 May 2010, in the final of the 2010 PDC Whyte & Mackay Premier League, Taylor became the first player in professional darts to hit two nine-dart finishes in a single match.

Career earnings
This includes money earned from all darts tournaments Taylor has participated in held by any darts organisation where the prize money is known. The money list rank covers both PDC and BDO players.

* As of 1 January 2020. Pro Tour events were not held until 2002.

Notes

References

Taylor, Phil